Pithie is a surname. Notable people with the surname include:

Dean Pithie (born 1974), English boxer
Les Pithie (1908–1980), New Zealand rower